Arthur S. Lawson, Jr. is the chief of police of the Louisiana city of Gretna. He is primarily known for his controversial actions in preventing New Orleans residents from entering Gretna via the Crescent City Connection during and after Hurricane Katrina.

References

External links
 Multiple articles highly critical of Lawson

People from Gretna, Louisiana
Living people
Year of birth missing (living people)
American municipal police chiefs